Nashville is a city in Washington County, Illinois, United States. As of the 2020 census, the city population was 3,105. It is the county seat of Washington County.

Geography
Nashville is located at  (38.348076, -89.381660).

Nashville is located on Nashville Creek, at the headwaters of Little Crooked Creek, which flows northwest into the Kaskaskia River. Just to the southeast of Nashville is the headwaters of Beaucoup Creek, which flows south into the Big Muddy River. Nashville is thus situated next to the Kaskaskia/Big Muddy divide.

History
Nashville was originally called New Nashville, and under the latter name was laid out in 1830. The local post office was established as Nashville in 1831. On June 28, 2020, Nashville was the site of a successful attempt at the world record for most pogo stick jumps with no hands. Caleb Klein set the record with 13,015 consecutive jumps.

Demographics

As of the census of 2000, there were 3,147 people, 1,324 households, and 884 families residing in the city. The racial makeup of the city was 98.73% White, 0.16% African American, 0.13% Native American, 0.38% Asian, 0.10% Pacific Islander, 0.19% from other races, and 0.32% from two or more races. Hispanic or Latino people of any race were 0.79% of the population.

There were 1,324 households, out of which 31.6% had children under the age of 18 living with them, 54.3% were married couples living together, 10.3% had a female householder with no husband present, and 33.2% were non-families. 30.4% of all households were made up of individuals, and 17.4% had someone living alone who was 65 years of age or older. The average household size was 2.36 and the average family size was 2.92.

In the city, the population was spread out, with 24.6% under the age of 18, 7.4% from 18 to 24, 27.5% from 25 to 44, 22.3% from 45 to 64, and 18.3% who were 65 years of age or older. The median age was 39 years. For every 100 females, there were 87.1 males. For every 100 females age 18 and over, there were 85.2 males.

The median income for a household in the city was $42,097, and the median income for a family was $51,875. Males had a median income of $34,020 versus $24,010 for females. The per capita income for the city was $21,935. About 1.9% of families and 4.4% of the population were below the poverty line, including 2.8% of those under age 18 and 9.6% of those age 65 or over.

Education
Primary schools
 One public school - Nashville Grade School
 Two parochial schools - Trinity-St. John Lutheran School and St. Ann Catholic School

Secondary school
 One public high school - Nashville Community High School District 99

Major employers 
A few manufacturing businesses have sites in Nashville. Nascote Industries is an automobile parts manufacturer that is part of Magna International; its Nashville plant was established in 1985, and employs over 1000 people. Grupo Antolin owns the other auto parts manufacturing plant in Nashville, employing 522 people as of 2018. The second plant was originally established in 1987 as Ligma Corporation, a joint venture between Magna International and Lignotock G.m.b.H. of West Germany. Norrenburns Truck Service, a trucking and warehouse outfit that was founded in 1925, was acquired in 1981 as a one-truck operation, moved to Nashville a few years later, where it has since expanded to 130 trucks and a staff of 275 people in 2004. Prior to Ligma and Nascote Industries, the town's biggest employer was National Mine Service Company (now part of the Marmon Group), which shut down operations in Nashville in 1983 and put 240 people out of work.

Media 
Nashville is served by both WNSV, the only FM station in the county, and The Nashville News, a weekly newspaper.

Notable people 

 G. R. Beckmeyer, Illinois state representative, businessman, and former mayor of Nashville
 Harry Blackmun, U.S. Supreme Court Justice, born in Nashville in 1908
 William St. John Forman, former U.S. Representative and former mayor of Nashville
 Hugh Green, Illinois politician, born near Nashville
 Byron O. House, Chief Justice of the Illinois Supreme Court, lived in Nashville
 Lloyd A. Karmeier, Illinois Supreme Court Justice, lives in Nashville and was a Circuit Court judge for the area
 Ralph L. Maxwell, Illinois Supreme Court justice, born in Nashville
 Thomas B. Needles, Illinois politician
 Royce Newman, offensive lineman for the Green Bay Packers
 Kirk Rueter, former pitcher for the San Francisco Giants

References

External links

 Nashville, Illinois Chamber of Commerce
 

Cities in Illinois
Cities in Washington County, Illinois
County seats in Illinois